Talla Sylla (born January 21, 1966) is a Senegalese politician and the leader of Action pour la Renaissance/Wallu Askanu Senegal (AR/WA Senegal). He was previously the leader of Alliance for Progress and Justice Jëf-Jël and was that party's candidate in the 2007 presidential election.

Biography
Sylla was born in Pikine, in the outskirts of Dakar. Sylla joined the African Independence Party at the age of 14. He later entered the Cheikh Anta Diop University to study sociology. In October 1987 he was elected president of the Dakar Students Coordination (CED). The following year he led a students strike. In 1990, after another students strike, Sylla was expelled from UCAD. He then shifted to France, to continue his studies there. At the University of Grenoble he founded the Youth for Change (JPA) in 1991. When Sylla returned to Senegal in 1995, JPA was transformed into a political party, Jëf-Jël. In the April 2001 parliamentary election, Sylla was the sole Jëf-Jël candidate elected to the National Assembly. He later resigned from the National Assembly and was replaced by Moussa Tine.

Sylla was attacked and severely injured outside a restaurant in Dakar on October 5, 2003, and was hospitalized as a result. He was subsequently taken to Paris for further treatment and eventually returned to Senegal on November 9, 2003.

In the February 2007 presidential election, Sylla took 0.53% of the vote and eighth place. He was again the only Jëf-Jël candidate to be elected to the National Assembly in the parliamentary election held on June 3, 2007, winning the seat through national list proportional representation. On June 5, 2007, he announced that he was leaving politics for health reasons; he attributed his health problems to the 2003 attack, which was allegedly done by people close to President Abdoulaye Wade.

References

External links
Le site web officiel de Talla Sylla Candidat aux Elections Presidentielles Senegalaises 2012 | 2012 candidates, Senegal
Article on Sylla in Le Quotidien

1966 births
Living people
People from Dakar Region
Alliance for Progress and Justice/Jëf-Jël politicians
Members of the National Assembly (Senegal)
Cheikh Anta Diop University alumni